Henty may refer to:

Australian geography
Henty, New South Wales
Henty, Victoria
Henty (wine) an Australian geographical indicator and wine region in southwestern Victoria
Division of Henty, a former federal electorate in Victoria
Henty Highway, western Victoria
Henty, Western Australia
Henty Gold Mine, Tasmania
Henty River, Tasmania

People
The Henty brothers prominent in early Victorian and Tasmanian white settlement:
 James Henty (1800–1882), founded James Henty and Company, merchants
 Charles Henty (1807–1864), banker and member of the Tasmanian House of Assembly
 William Henty (1808–1881), solicitor, member of the Tasmanian Legislative Council for Tamar, and colonial secretary in the Weston cabinet
 Edward Henty (1810–1878), pioneer, first permanent settler in Victoria in 1834
 Stephen George Henty (1811–1872), member of the Legislative Council of Victoria, 1856–1870
 John Henty (1813-1868?)
 Francis Henty (1815–1889), farmer and grazier
Denham Henty
Edward Henty (cricketer) (1839–1900), English cricketer
Ernest Henty MLC (1862–1905), Western Australian politician
G. A. Henty (1832–1902), British novelist
Thomas Henty (born Thomas John Cooper 1956–1988), English actor
Thomas Henty (Australian politician) (c. 1836–1887), Victorian MLC